Mitochondrial antiviral-signaling protein (MAVS) is a protein that is essential for antiviral innate immunity. MAVS is located in the outer membrane of the mitochondria, peroxisomes, and mitochondrial-associated endoplasmic reticulum membrane (MAM). Upon viral infection, a group of cytosolic proteins will detect the presence of the virus and bind to MAVS, thereby activating MAVS. The activation of MAVS leads the virally infected cell to secrete cytokines. This induces an immune response which kills the host's virally infected cells, resulting in clearance of the virus.

Structure 

MAVS is also known as IFN-β promoter stimulator I (IPS-1), caspase activation recruitment domain adaptor inducing I FN-β(CARDIF), or virus induced signaling adaptor (VISA). MAVS is encoded by a MAVS gene. MAVS is a 540 amino acid protein that consists of three components, a N terminal caspase activation recruitment domain (CARD), a proline rich domain, and a transmembrane C terminal domain (TM).

After the MAVS gene has been transcribed into RNA, ribosomes can translate the MAVS protein from two different sites. The initial translation site generates the full-length MAVS protein. The alternative translation site generates a shorter protein, termed as “miniMAVS” or short-MAVS (sMAVS). sMAVS is a 398 amino acid MAVS protein that lacks the CARD domain. This is significant because the CARD domain is where two cytosolic proteins bind to activate MAVS, signaling that there is a virus present in the cell.

Function 

Double stranded RNA viruses are recognized by either the transmembrane toll-like receptor 3 (TLR3) or by one of two cytosolic proteins, retinoic acid-inducible gene I (RIG-I)-like receptors and melanoma differentiation-associated gene 5 (MDA5). RIG-I and MDA5 differ in the viral RNA that they recognize, but they share many structural features, including the N-terminal CARD that allows them to bind to MAVS. MAVS activation leads to the increased levels of pro-inflammatory cytokines via activation of transcription factors, nuclear factor kB (NF-kB), interferon regulatory factor 1 (IRF1), and interferon regulatory factor 3 (IRF3). NFkB, IRF1, and IRF3 are transcription factors and play critical roles in the production of cytokines. 

At a resting state for the cell, a protein called mitofusin 2 (MFN2) is known to interact with MAVS, preventing MAVS from binding to the cytosolic proteins, such as RIG-I and MDA5. Upon recognition of the virus in the cytosol, mitochondria-associated ER membranes (MAM) and mitochondria will become physically tethered by MFN2 and RIG-I binds to a second RIG-I protein to form a protein complex. This complex binds to TRIM25 and molecular chaperone 14-3-3e to form a complex termed “translocon”. The translocon travels to the mitochondria where it binds to the CARD region on MAVS, leading to activation of MAVS. Subsequently, MAVS proteins bind to each other through the CARD and TM domain to recruit several downstream signaling factors to form the MAVS signaling complex. The formation of this MAVS signaling complex is aided by augmented levels of mitochondrial reactive oxygen species (mROS), independent of the RNA sensing. The MAVS signaling complex interacts with TANK binding kinase 1 and/or protein kinases IKKA (CHUK) and IKKB (IKBKB), which leads to the phosphorylation and nuclear translocation of IRF3. Although MAVS signal transduction and regulation is not fully understood, activated MAVS proteins in the mitochondria, ER, and peroxisome are needed to maximize the antiviral innate immune response.

MAVS protein induces apoptosis in host virally infected cells by interacting with a protease called caspase 8. Activation of apoptosis by caspase 8 is independent of the Bax/Bak apoptotic pathway, the main pathway of apoptosis in cells.

Viral evasion 
Certain viruses, such as human cytomegalovirus (HCMV) and hepatitis C (HCV), have adapted to suppress the function of MAVS in the antiviral innate immune response, aiding in viral replication. HCMV impairs MAVS through the viral mitochondria-localized inhibitor of apoptosis protein (vMIA), thus reducing the pro-inflammatory cytokine response. vMIA also localizes to the peroxisome where vMIA interacts with cytoplasmic chaperone protein Pex19, disabling the transport machinery of peroxisomal membrane proteins. The HCV NS3-NS4A strain inactivates MAVS signaling by cleaving the MAVS protein directly upstream of MAVS membrane-targeting domain in the MAM and peroxisome, preventing MAVS downstream signaling.

Regulation 
The expression and function of MAVS are regulated at the transcriptional, posttranscriptional, and posttranslational level. At the transcriptional level, the reactive oxygen species (ROS) generated during antiviral response acts as a negative regulator. MAVS, additionally, encodes a number of splice variants that have been proposed to regulate MAVS. At the post-transcriptional level, there are two translational sites present on MAVS that can generate two proteins of MAVS. The alternative translation site resides upstream, resulting in expression of sMAVS. At the translational level, proteins such as a family of ubiquitin E3 ligase regulate MAVS activity.

References

Further reading